The Burke–Berryman House, at 418 Cheney St. in Reno, Nevada, is a historic house with elements of Queen Anne and Colonial Revival architecture.  It was built c.1909-10 as a rental house in the "Burke's Addition" area of Reno, developed by Charles H. Burke.

An early occupant was Samuel W. Goodale, a Chief Surveyor with the U.S. Survey Office, who lived there up to c.1917.  It was sold to James J. Berryman in 1919 and he and his wife lived there from 1919 to 1934.  It is one of relatively few houses of its era surviving in its neighborhood. It is now owned and maintained by the mental health company Zephyr Wellness.

It was listed on the National Register of Historic Places in 2004.  It was deemed significant "its role in Reno's community planning and development history" and "as an excellent local example of simplified residential Queen Anne/Colonial Revival architecture."

See also 

Charles H. Burke House, also in the Burke Addition area and also NRHP-listed

References 

Houses on the National Register of Historic Places in Nevada
Queen Anne architecture in Nevada
Colonial Revival architecture in Nevada
Houses completed in 1910
National Register of Historic Places in Reno, Nevada
Houses in Reno, Nevada